No. 14 Group RAF  was the title of several Royal Air Force groups, including a group responsible for anti-submarine activity from 1918 to 1919 after being transferred from the Royal Naval Air Service; a fighter group formed from a wing in the British Expeditionary Force in 1940; and finally a fighter group covering Scotland from 1940 to 1943.

History 
No. 14 Group RAF was first formed on 1 April 1918 by the re-designation of Milford Haven Anti-Submarine Group. On 8 May it was transferred to Midland Area, and it was disbanded on 19 May 1919.

It was reformed as No. 14 (Fighter) Group on 20 January 1940 as part of the wartime expansion of the Royal Air Force when No. 60 Wing in the British Expeditionary Force was raised to group level under the command of World War I flying ace Group Captain Philip Fletcher Fullard. The Group was disbanded on 22 June.

Only three days later 14 Group was reformed in Fighter Command to provide cover for Scotland, and was then under the command of Air Vice-Marshal Malcolm Henderson from 20 July 1940 and throughout the Battle of Britain, before coming under the command of Air Vice-Marshal John D'Albiac from 10 February 1942. The Group was then under the command of Canadian flying ace Air Vice-Marshal Raymond Collishaw from 21 March 1942 until the Group was finally disbanded on 15 July 1943.

Air Officers Commanding

References 

014
Military units and formations established in 1918
Military units and formations disestablished in 1919
Military units and formations established in 1940
014
Military units and formations disestablished in 1943
1918 establishments in the United Kingdom